How I Discovered America is a 1949 Italian comedy film directed by Carlo Borghesio and starring Erminio Macario, Carlo Ninchi and Delia Scala.

Plot
Italy, late 1940s. A young unemployed guy and a wily tramp move to South America in search of fortune, but after several misadventures, they will eventually decide to return to Italy.

Cast 

 Erminio Macario as Cristoforo Colombo  
 Carlo Ninchi as Gaetano 
 Delia Scala as Lisa
 Folco Lulli as Signorotto 
 Nino Pavese as Il capo compagnia 
 Nunzio Filogamo as The Priest
  Dario Michaelis as  Lisa's Fiancee
 Alfredo Rizzo as A Nazist  
 Carlo Rizzo as A Nazist  
 Pina Gallini as La sudamericana

References

External links

Italian comedy films
1949 comedy films
1949 films
Films directed by Carlo Borghesio
Films scored by Nino Rota
Films about immigration
Italian black-and-white films
Lux Film films
1940s Italian films